Samuel Anthony Peeples (September 22, 1917 – August 27, 1997) was an American writer. He published several novels in the Western genre, often under the pen name Brad Ward, before moving into American series television after being given a script assignment by Frank Gruber. In addition to writing Western television scripts, he created several Western series, notably Lancer (1968), Frontier Circus (1961), The Tall Man (1961), and co-created the series Custer (1967).

Peeples was a literary science fiction enthusiast who also occasionally wrote science fiction for Television, starting by providing advice and reference material to friend and colleague Gene Roddenberry as the latter created what became the original Star Trek series. Peeples was one of three writers selected to write a proposed second pilot for the series, and his script, "Where No Man Has Gone Before" (1965), was filmed and sold the series. He contributed the first aired episode of the animated Star Trek series, "Beyond the Farthest Star" (1973). He also worked with Roddenberry on the script for the 1977 TV movie (and unsuccessful series pilot) Spectre. Peeples wrote an unused alternative script, Worlds That Never Were, for the second Star Trek motion picture. The name of one character from his draft, Doctor Savik, would eventually get reused for the character Lieutenant Saavik.

Peeples wrote a number of episodes for Filmation's live action Space Academy and Jason of Star Command series and wrote the script for their animated TV movie and seven first season episodes of the Flash Gordon series that resulted from it.

Peeples died of cancer on August 27, 1997 at age 79, just one month short of his eightieth birthday.

Novels
 The Dream Ends in Fury (1949) (paperback title: Outlaw Vengeance)
 The Hanging Hills (as Brad Ward) (1952)
 Johnny Sundance (as Brad Ward)  (1953)
 The Marshal Of Medicine Bend (as Brad Ward)  (1954)
 The Baron of Boot Hill (as Brad Ward)  (1954)
 The Lobo Horseman (1955) aka (The Lobo Horseman: Was he the last threat to Dynamite Valley?)
 The Call of the Gun (1955)
 The Man from Andersonville (1956) (as Brad Ward)
 Terror at Tres Alamos (1956)
 Doc Colt (1957)
 Frontier Street (as Brad Ward)  (1958)
 The Man Who Died Twice (1976)
 Why I Am A Gangster (1978)

Films
 Advance to the Rear (with William Bowers) 1967
 Final Chapter: Walking Tall (with Howard B. Kreitzek) 1977

Television Series, as creator
 The Tall Man  1960
  Custer 1967
  Lancer 1968, and wrote the pilot "High Riders"

Television scripts
   Tales of Wells Fargo
 “The Most Dangerous Man Alive” 1958 
 Wanted: Dead or Alive 1958
 "The Bounty"
 "Rawhide Breed"
 "Bounty for a Bride"
 The Rifleman 1958
 "The Angry Gun
 Bonanza 1959
 "The Saddle Stiff"
  Have Gun – Will Travel 
  "Fight at Adobe Wells"  1960  
 Overland Trail 1960
 Dick Powell's Zane Grey Theatre(TV series) 1958
 "Medal of Valor" 1958
 "Daughter of the Sioux"
 "First Stage to Denver"
 "High Bridge"
 "The Most Dangerous Gentleman"
 "Vigilantes of Montana"
 "Westbound Stage"
 Burke's Law 1963
 The Rogues 1964
 "Our Men in Marawat"
 A Man Called Shenandoah 1965
 The Legend of Jesse James 1965
 Star Trek 1966
 "Where No Man Has Gone Before"
 Bonanza 1972
 "The Saddle Stiff"
 Star Trek 1973
 "Beyond the Farthest Star"
 Jason of Star Command 1978
 season 1, episodes 1 to 6

TV movies
 Spectre (with Gene Roddenberry) 1977
 A Real American Hero 1978
 Flash Gordon: The Greatest Adventure of All 1982

See also
List of Ace Titles in first DGS series

References

External links
 
 
 Samuel A. Peeples biography at Answers.com

1917 births
1997 deaths
20th-century American novelists
American male novelists
American television writers
American male television writers
American male screenwriters
20th-century American male writers
20th-century American screenwriters